Larry Donnell Drew (born April 2, 1958) is an American professional basketball coach and former player who serves as assistant coach for the Los Angeles Clippers of the National Basketball Association (NBA).

Drew was named to the Kansas Sports Hall of Fame in 2018.

College career 
Drew, a point guard, played college basketball for the Missouri Tigers.

Professional career

NBA (1980–1991) 
Drew was selected by the Detroit Pistons in the first round of the 1980 NBA draft with the 17th overall pick. He played 10 seasons in the NBA for the Pistons, Kansas City/Sacramento Kings, Los Angeles Clippers and Los Angeles Lakers. In his NBA career, Drew played in 714 games and scored a total of 8,110 points.

Perhaps Drew's best year as a professional came during the 1982–83 season as a member of the Kings, appearing in 75 games and averaging 20.1 points, 8.1 assists and 1.7 steals per contest. That season on Jan 21, 1983, Drew scored a career-high 33 points during a 115-108 victory over the Houston Rockets.

Scavolini (1988–1989) 
In 1988–89, Drew played in the Italian League with Scavolini.

Coaching career
Drew served as an assistant coach for the Los Angeles Lakers (1992–1999), Detroit Pistons (1999–2000), Washington Wizards (2000–2003), New Jersey Nets (2003–2004), and Atlanta Hawks (2004–2010).

He became the head coach of the Atlanta Hawks in 2010–11. His contract expired after the 2012–13 season, when the Hawks hired Mike Budenholzer to replace Drew.

On May 31, 2013, the Milwaukee Bucks hired Drew as their head coach. On June 30, 2014, the Bucks fired Drew from their head coaching position after acquiring head coach Jason Kidd from the Brooklyn Nets.

On August 19, 2014, the Cleveland Cavaliers hired Drew as their assistant coach. On June 19, 2016, the Cavaliers with Drew as an assistant coach, won their first NBA Championship. On March 19, 2018, the Cavaliers named Drew interim head coach while Cavaliers coach Tyronn Lue took a leave for health issues. The Cavaliers were 8–1 in the nine games Drew served in Lue's absence. On October 28, 2018, the Cavaliers named Drew their acting head coach following the firing of Lue. Drew sought additional money if he were to be the Cavaliers' interim head coach instead of the team hiring a new leader. On November 5, he was named as permanent head coach. On April 11, 2019, Drew and the Cavaliers parted ways after his contract expired after the 2018–19 season.

On November 16, 2020, Drew was hired as an assistant coach for the Los Angeles Clippers under head coach Tyronn Lue.

Head coaching record

|-
| style="text-align:left;"|Atlanta
| style="text-align:left;"|
| 82 || 44 || 38 ||  || style="text-align:center;"|3rd in Southeast || 12 || 6 || 6 || 
| style="text-align:center;"|Lost in Conf. Semifinals
|-
| style="text-align:left;"|Atlanta
| style="text-align:left;"|
| 66 || 40 || 26 ||  || style="text-align:center;"|2nd in Southeast || 6 || 2 || 4 || 
| style="text-align:center;"|Lost in First Round
|-
| style="text-align:left;"|Atlanta
| style="text-align:left;"|
| 82 || 44 || 38 ||  || style="text-align:center;"|2nd in Southeast || 6 || 2 || 4 || 
| style="text-align:center;"|Lost in First Round
|-
| style="text-align:left;"|Milwaukee
| style="text-align:left;"|
| 82 || 15 || 67 ||  || style="text-align:center;"|5th in Central || — || — || — || —
| style="text-align:center;"|Missed playoffs
|-
| style="text-align:left;"|Cleveland
| style="text-align:left;"|
| 76 || 19 || 57 ||  || style="text-align:center;"|5th in Central || — || — || — || —
| style="text-align:center;"|Missed playoffs
|- class="sortbottom"
| style="text-align:center;" colspan="2"|Career
| 388 || 162 || 226 || || || 24 || 10 || 14 ||  ||

Personal life
Drew is married to Sharon Drew and they have three children, Larry II, Landon and Lindsey. His older son, Larry II, played collegiate basketball at North Carolina before transferring to UCLA in 2011. He last played in the NBA for the New Orleans Pelicans. His middle son, Landon, played for Cal State Northridge. His youngest son, Lindsey, played for Nevada.

See also

References

External links

 NBA.com coach profile

1958 births
Living people
African-American basketball coaches
African-American basketball players
American expatriate basketball people in Italy
American men's basketball coaches
American men's basketball players
Atlanta Hawks assistant coaches
Atlanta Hawks head coaches
Basketball coaches from Kansas
Basketball players from Kansas
Cleveland Cavaliers assistant coaches
Cleveland Cavaliers head coaches
Detroit Pistons assistant coaches
Detroit Pistons draft picks
Detroit Pistons players
Kansas City Kings players
Los Angeles Clippers players
Los Angeles Lakers assistant coaches
Los Angeles Lakers players
Milwaukee Bucks head coaches
Missouri Tigers men's basketball players
New Jersey Nets assistant coaches
Point guards
Sacramento Kings players
Sportspeople from Kansas City, Kansas
Washington Wizards assistant coaches
21st-century African-American people
20th-century African-American sportspeople